This is a list of media outlets in Guelph, Ontario, Canada.

Newspapers

Weeklies
Guelph Mercury Tribune - twice-weekly community newspaper
The Wellington Advertiser -  distributed throughout Wellington County, but often includes Guelph-related news

Monthly
Snap'd Guelph - monthly photo community newspaper

Online
Guelph Local - Daily online community news site.
GuelphToday.com - Daily online news site.

Student
The Cannon - online newspaper serving the community at the University of Guelph
The Ontarion - The University of Guelph's student newspaper, published weekly and distributed throughout the city

Regional dailies
The Record - Kitchener-Waterloo newspaper that also covers Guelph and the area
Toronto Star
Toronto Sun

National dailies
The Globe and Mail
National Post

Former Newspapers
Guelph Mercury - Guelph's daily newspaper
Guelph Tribune

Radio
AM 1460 - CJOY, oldies
FM 93.3 - CFRU, community and campus radio station based out of the University of Guelph
FM 106.1 - CIMJ ("Magic 106.1 FM"), hot adult contemporary
FM 101.1 - CICW ("The Grand @ 101"), adult contemporary
Guelph is also within the broadcast range of virtually all radio stations in the Kitchener-Waterloo market, as well as some from Hamilton.

On March 13, 2008, the Canadian Radio-television and Telecommunications Commission (CRTC) called for applications for a broadcasting licence to carry on a radio programming undertaking to serve the Guelph market. See also: On January 23, 2009, all applications to carry on a radio programming to serve the Guelph market were denied.

Television
Rogers TV Channel 20
Kitchener's CKCO (CTV) also serves Guelph.

City weblogs

The Fountain Pen - Guelph's online newspaper
Blog Guelph - photoblog and Soft Community News
Guelph Politico - Coverage of City Council and Local News

References

Guelph
Media, Guelph